Bangor is a commune in the Morbihan department in the Brittany region of north-western France. It is one of the four communes on the island of Belle-Île.

The inhabitants of Bangor are called Bangorins.

Geography 
Bangor is one of four communes on the island of Belle Île located on the south-west coast of the island. The island is some 14 km south of the Quiberon peninsula. Access to the commune is by the D190 road from Le Palais in the north and the D25 from Locmaria in the east which continues to Sauzon in the north-west. There is the small Aerodrome de Belle-Île in the north of the commune which hosts the Aeroclub de Belle-Ile en Mer. Apart from the village there are many hamlets in the commune:

 Bordenec'h
 Bornor
 Borsauz
 Calestren
 Cosquet
 Domois
 Donnant
 Goélan
 Le Grand Village
 Kerguélen
 Kerourdé
 Kervarijon
 Parlavan
 Radenac
 Tinéüé
 Le Vazen

Several offshore islands also belong to the commune as well as other unnamed islets:
 Ile de Bangor
 Roches de Bornor
 Iles de Domois
 Iles de Baguenères
 Aiguilles Rocheuses

The commune consists almost entirely of farmland.

Climate 
The commune is exposed to strong winds.

Neighbouring communes and villages

Map

Toponymy 
It is not known if the name comes from Bangor Abbey in Northern Ireland, one of the most famous abbeys in Western Christianity, from where it is known that monks like Columbanus came to evangelize in Armorica in the 6th century, or from the Monastery of Bangor-Fawr, founded in Wales around 545 on the Menai Strait.

The Breton name of the commune is Bangor.

History 

The commune of Bangor has been inhabited since prehistory as evidenced by the Pierre Sainte Anne menhir.

Bangor has been the administrative centre of the island for 10 centuries. It was the name of a priory founded by Benedictine monks who came to colonize and populate the island starting in the 7th century.

Colonization consisted of dividing the island into five parishes with Bangor occupying the middle Each parish was a small area given to residual families from the island or to colonists who were asked by the monks to come to Brittany.

In the 9th century the island was devastated by the Vikings and the priory was placed under the secular protection of the Counts of Cornouaille (in Armorican Brittany). In 1029 the Count of Cornouaille Alain Canhiart entrusted the island to the recently founded Sainte-Croix de Quimperlé Abbey. As it was directly under the authority of the Pope, Belle-Ile benefited from immunity from being under the authority of both the bishopric of Vannes and the duchy of Brittany. The administration of the island was delegated to a provost of the abbey who had temporal power (the right of low, middle, and high justice which was performed sometimes at Belle-Ile and sometimes at Quimperlé). From 1408 the right was exercised only at Quimperlé.

The Count of Cornouaille entrusted the island to the Benedictines of Redon Abbey who were able to take possession of it after long protests from the abbot of Quimperlé. The priory remained in the same spot as its predecessors (on the current location of the municipal campground of Bangor) and a fort was constructed at Le Palais which later became the capital of the island instead of Bangor.

Belle-Île was governed by monks until the 16th century when incessant attacks by pirates forced them to relinquish their fiefdom to the king, or rather to the regent Catherine de' Medici, who gave the land in vassalage to the Gondi family – then owners of the Pays de Retz. The land, however, remained under the heavy hand of the regime until the French Revolution.

The Goulphar Lighthouse on the west coast of Bangor has been active since 1836.

The semaphore of Talut was put into service in 1862.

Administration 
List of Successive Mayors

Mayors from 1935

Demography 
In 2017 the commune had 999 inhabitants.

Culture and heritage

Civil heritage 
The commune has many buildings and structures that are registered as historical monuments:
 A Tumulus NE of the Aerodrome (Prehistoric)
 An old Radar Station at Port-Croton (20th century)
 The Goulphar Lighthouse (1826) has one of the most powerful lights on the French coast. Built from 1826 to 1833, it was commissioned in 1835 and is a granite building 47 m high which rises to 84 m above the sea level. Its light beam flashes at intervals of 3 and 7 seconds. With the present optical system it is visible at 28 Nautical miles.
 Fortified works (18th century)
 The Pierre Sainte Anne Menhir at Kervarijon (Prehistoric)
 A Tumulus at Kervarijon (Prehistoric)
 Houses (19th century)
 The Town Hall (19th century)
 A Bakery at Borsauz (18th century)
 The Loge Agricultural Store room at Bordenec'h (19th century)
 A Well at Radenac (19th century)
 A Mill at Varrec (1858)

Religious heritage 

The commune has several religious buildings and structures that are registered as historical monuments:
 Monumental Crosses (19th-20th century)
 The Parish Church of Saints Peter and Paul (16th century)
 A Presbytery (1790)
 The Chapels of Saint-Guénolé, Saint-Thomas, and Saint-Armand (destroyed)

Bangor Picture Gallery

Notable people linked to the commune 
 John Russell, Australian painter, arrived at Belle-Île-en-Mer in 1883. He first stayed in a rented house in Envag before building a mansion called the "Château de l'anglais" (English Chateau) at Goulphar.
 Claude Monet lived in the village of Kervilahouen
 Françoise Bangor, the first woman painter in Belle-Île, stayed in Envague. She often came on holidays with her parents and succumbed to the beauty of the island. She continued to paint the rugged coastline, the villages, and to sketch the fishermen from 1935 to 1953.
 Henry Moret, painted Goulpher

Paintings of Bangor

See also 
 Communes of the Morbihan department

References

External links 
 
 Bangor official website 
 Bangor on the Gencom website (many links) 
 Old postcards of Bangor 
 Page about Bangor, Belle-Ile, with a map of the small town 
 Bangor on Géoportail, National Geographic Institute (IGN) website 
 Bangor on the 1750 Cassini Map

Communes of Morbihan
Populated coastal places in Brittany